Jędrzejewicz is a Polish surname. Notable people with the surname include:

 Janusz Jędrzejewicz (1885–1951), Polish politician
 Ludwika Jędrzejewicz (1807–1855), sister of Polish composer Frédéric Chopin
 Wacław Jędrzejewicz, Polish diplomat

Polish-language surnames